The 1992 Korean League Cup, also known as the Adidas Cup 1992, was the second competition of the Korean League Cup. Ilhwa Chunma became the champions.

League

Table

Matches

Final

Awards

Source:

See also
1992 K League

References

External links
Official website
RSSSF

1992
1992
1992 domestic association football cups
1992 in South Korean football